Charmaine Tweet is a Canadian mixed martial artist who competes in the Featherweight division. She is currently signed with Invicta FC.

Kickboxing career
Tweet began training with kickboxer Duke Roufus in 2001 and stayed with his team until 2005.  Her current kickboxing record is 10 wins, 1 loss and 1 draw.

Mixed martial arts career

Early career
In June 2011, Tweet made her professional MMA debut, losing to future UFC Women's Bantamweight champion Ronda Rousey.  Over the next two years, Tweet would build her record to 4 wins and 3 losses before signing to Invicta FC.

After the loss to Cyborg Tweet returned to Canada to fight with Prestige FC. She had rematch with Anna Barone at Prestige FC 1, finishing her in the first round.

She was then set to fight Jessy Miele for the vacant Prestige FC Featherweight Championship. She won via unanimous decision.

Invicta FC
In her promotional debut in December 2013, Tweet faced Julia Budd at Invicta FC 7.  She lost the fight by unanimous decision.

Tweet returned to the promotion on September 6, 2014 to face Veronica Rothenhausler at Invicta FC 8.  She won the fight via TKO in the first round.

Tweet next faced Cris Cyborg on February 27, 2015 for the Featherweight title at Invicta FC 11.  She lost the fight via TKO in the first round.

Tweet returned at Invicta FC 17 to take on the undefeated Latoya Walker. She won via TKO in the first round.

Championships and accomplishments

Kickboxing
2009 – IFMA World Championships, Light Middleweight 
2010 IKF World Classic – IKF World Championships, Welterweight

Mixed Martial Arts
Prestige FC
Prestige FC Women's Featherweight Championship

Mixed martial arts record

 
|-
|Loss
|align=center|9–6
| Megan Anderson
| TKO (punches and head kick)
| Invicta FC 21: Anderson vs. Tweet
|
|align=center|2
|align=center|2:05
|Kansas City, Missouri, United States
| For the Interim Invicta FC Featherweight Championship.
|-
|Win
|align=center|9–5
| Latoya Walker
| TKO (spinning back fist)
| Invicta FC 17: Evinger vs. Schneider
|
|align=center|1
|align=center|3:41
|Costa Mesa, California, United States
|
|-
|Win
|align=center|8–5
| Jessy Miele
| Decision (unanimous)
| Prestige FC 2: Queen City Coronation
|
|align=center|5
|align=center|5:00
|Regina, Saskatchewan, Canada
| Won Prestige FC Featherweight Championship.
|-
|Win
|align=center|7–5
| Anna Barone
| TKO (retirement)
| Prestige FC 1: Atonement
|
|align=center|1
|align=center|3:41
|Weyburn, Saskatchewan, Canada
|
|-
|Loss
|align=center|6–5
| Cris Cyborg
| TKO (punches)
| Invicta FC 11: Cyborg vs. Tweet
|
|align=center|1
|align=center|0:46
|Los Angeles, California, United States
| For the Invicta FC Featherweight Championship.
|-
|Win
|align=center|6–4
| Veronica Rothenhausler
| TKO (punches)
| Invicta FC 8: Waterson vs. Tamada
|
|align=center|1
|align=center|4:05
|Kansas City, Missouri, United States
|
|-
|Win
|align=center|5–4
| Anna Barone
| Submission (rear-naked choke) 
| MMA Fight Night 2 
|
|align=center|1
|align=center|3:15
|Montreal, Quebec, Canada
|
|-
|Loss
|align=center|4–4
| Julia Budd
| Decision (unanimous)
| Invicta FC 7: Honchak vs. Smith
|
|align=center|3
|align=center|5:00
|Kansas City, Missouri, United States
|
|-
|Win
|align=center|4–3
| Amanda Bell
| Submission (rear-naked choke) 
| BFTB 2 - Redemption
|
|align=center|1
|align=center|4:18
|Cranbrook, British Columbia, Canada
|
|-
|Win
|align=center|3–3
| Sy Jewett
| Submission (rear-naked choke) 
| AFC 15 - The Ides
|
|align=center|1
|align=center|2:25
|Calgary, Alberta, Canada
|
|-
|Win
|align=center|2–3
| Puja Kadian
| Submission (guillotine choke) 
| SFL 10 
|
|align=center|1
|align=center|0:45
|Mumbai, India
|
|-
|Loss
|align=center|1–3
| Adrienne Seiber
| Decision (split)
| HKFC - School of Hard Knocks 25
|
|align=center|3
|align=center|5:00
|Medicine Hat, Alberta, Canada
|
|-
|Win
|align=center|1–2
| Marshelle Weinberger
| Submission (guillotine choke) 
| HKFC - School of Hard Knocks 20
|
|align=center|1
|align=center|1:19
|Calgary, Alberta, Canada
|
|-
|Loss
|align=center|0–2
| Anna Barone
| KO (punches) 
| BEP 5 - Breast Cancer Beatdown
|
|align=center|1
|align=center|0:18
|Fletcher, North Carolina, United States
|
|-
|Loss
|align=center|0–1
| Ronda Rousey
| Submission (armbar) 
| HKFC - School of Hard Knocks 12
|
|align=center|1
|align=center|0:49
|Calgary, Alberta, Canada
|Catchweight (150 lbs) bout.

Kickboxing record

|-
|-  bgcolor="FFBBBB"
| 2018-02-27 || Loss ||align=left| Genah Fabian || || Pleasanton, CA, United States || KO || 2 || || 
|-
! style=background:white colspan=9 |
|-
|-
| colspan=9 | Legend:

References

External links

1977 births
Living people
Sportspeople from Regina, Saskatchewan
Canadian Muay Thai practitioners
Female Muay Thai practitioners
Canadian female mixed martial artists
Canadian female kickboxers
Featherweight mixed martial artists
Lightweight mixed martial artists
Mixed martial artists utilizing Muay Thai
Welterweight kickboxers
Middleweight kickboxers